Antonio de Tort (born 1893, date of death unknown) was a Spanish diver. He competed in two events at the 1924 Summer Olympics.

References

External links
 

1893 births
Year of death missing
Spanish male divers
Olympic divers of Spain
Divers at the 1924 Summer Olympics
Sportspeople from Barcelona